Helen Vanderburg (born January 12, 1959) is a former Canadian synchronized swimmer and world champion.

Career
Vanderburg began synchronized swimming in 1969 at age eleven. From 1971 to 1973, she was a member of junior national championship teams, and in 1973 she captured the junior Canadian solo and duet championships. In 1977, Vanderburg joined the senior ranks, winning the solo and duet competition, with partner Michelle Calkins, at the Canadian Aquatic Championships, the first of three years that she won both events. Vanderburg was the first non-American to win the World Championship at both the Solo and Duet events, doing so at the 1978 World Aquatic Championships in West Berlin. After Calkins' retirement in 1978 Vanderburg partnered with Kelly Kryczka, they went on to win gold in the duet at the 1979 Pan American Games, Vanderburg also won gold in the solo event. Vanderburg retired from competition in 1979.

Titles
1979
 Pan American Games (in Puerto Rico) - gold in both solo and duet; silver in the team
 Fina World Cup (in Tokyo) - gold in both solo and duet
 Pan Pacific Games (in Christchurch, New Zealand) - gold in solo
 Canadian Senior Champion - solo, duet and figures

1978
 World Aquatics Championships (in Berlin) - gold in both solo and duet
 Canadian Senior Champion - solo, duet and figures

1977
 Pan Pacific Games (in Mexico City, Mexico) - gold in duet; silver in solo and team
 Canadian Senior Champion - both solo and duet

1973
 Canadian Jr. Champion - both solo and duet

Honors
Vanderburg was awarded the Velma Springstead Trophy in 1979 as Canada's outstanding female athlete of the year Vanderburg was elected to the Canadian Sports Hall of Fame in 1983. She was inducted into the Alberta Sports Hall of Fame in 1980, and in 1985, she was inducted into the International Swimming Hall of Fame.

See also
 List of members of the International Swimming Hall of Fame

References

External links
 Official web site
 Canada's Sport Hall of Fame profile
 International Swimming Hall of Fame profile
 Alberta Sports Hall of Fame and Museum profile

1959 births
Living people
Alberta Sports Hall of Fame inductees
Canadian people of Dutch descent
Swimmers from Calgary
Canadian synchronized swimmers
University of Calgary alumni
Pan American Games medalists in synchronized swimming
Pan American Games gold medalists for Canada
Pan American Games silver medalists for Canada
Synchronized swimmers at the 1979 Pan American Games
Medalists at the 1979 Pan American Games